The 2011 Turkmenistan Cup is 19th since independence of the Turkmen national football cup.

Quarterfinals
The quarterfinal involves 8 best teams of previous regular season.

|}

First leg

Second leg

FC Lebap won 2–1 on aggregate.

FC Aşgabat won 3–2 on aggregate.

Şagadam 3–3 HTTU on aggregate. HTTU won 4–2 on penalties.

FC Merw won 9–1 on aggregate.

Semifinals

|}

First leg

Second leg

FC Aşgabat won 2–2 on away goals.

HTTU Aşgabat won 2–2 on away goals.

Final

See also
 2011 Ýokary Liga

External links
 http://www.turkmenistan.gov.tm
 http://www.the-afc.com

Turkmenistan Cup
Turkmenistan Cup, 2011